Vitry may refer to:

People
 Odo of Vitry (died 1158), French nobleman
 Jacques de Vitry (c. 1160–1240), French chronicler and cardinal
 Raoul de Vitry (1895–1977), French aristocrat and business executive
 Henryk Vitry, pen name of Tadeusz Żakiej (1915–1994), Polish food writer
 Philippe de Vitry (1291–1361), French composer, music theorist and poet
 Simhah ben Samuel of Vitry (died 1105), French Talmudist and the compiler of the Mahzor Vitry

Communes in France

Haute-Marne departement
 Vitry-en-Montagne
 Vitry-lès-Nogent

Marne departement
 Vitry-en-Perthois
 Vitry-la-Ville
 Vitry-le-François

Saône-et-Loire departement
 Vitry-en-Charollais
 Vitry-lès-Cluny
 Vitry-sur-Loire

In other departements
 Vitry-aux-Loges, in the Loiret departement
 Vitry-en-Artois, in the Pas-de-Calais departement
 Vitry-Laché, in the Nièvre departement
 Vitry-le-Croisé, in the Aube departement
 Vitry-sur-Orne, in the Moselle departement
 Vitry-sur-Seine, in the Val-de-Marne departement

Other uses
 Simhah ben Samuel of Vitry (the Mahzor Vitry), a Jewish prayer book manuscript of the early 12th century, attributed to Rabbi Simhah ben Samuel of Vitry